The  (fv; English: Specialist book publisher Leipzig) was an East German publisher. It continues to exist as an imprint of the Munich publishing firm Carl Hanser Verlag.

Company history
The publishing house was founded in early 1949 by several shareholders (including FDGB). From 1960 to 1990 the specialist book publisher was a Volkseigener Betrieb (VEB) (English, "publicly owned enterprise"). It was one of the two most renowned technical-scientific publishers in the German Democratic Republic, whose specialist books were also widely distributed in the Federal Republic of Germany. The books were very popular with West-German students because of their low price, but above all because of the good didactics. It also published specialist journals.

In 1995, the specialist book publisher was taken over by the Munich Carl Hanser Verlag and continued to exist there as an imprint. Under the brand, some of the editors of Carl Hanser Verlag continue to publish around 60 specialist books a year. The subject areas are general technology, mechanical engineering, electrical engineering, computer science, environmental and media technology, as well as economics, plastics and process engineering.

Book series
 Bibliothek Wissen und Schaffen
 Grosse Sowjet-Enzyklopädie
 Holztechnik
 Lehrbücher für den Facharbeiter fur Holztechnik
 Nachschlagebücher für Grundlagenfächer
 Polytechnische Bibliothek

See also 
 B. G. Teubner Verlag

References 

  (NB. According to  this work contains many factual errors.)
  (NB. Magister work of the author at Leuphana Universität Lüneburg in 1997.)
  (NB. First edition: ISBN 978-3-86153-523-2. This work is based on the dissertation of the author at Humboldt-Universität Berlin under the title  in 2008.)

External links 
 Homepage

Volkseigene Betriebe
Academic publishing companies
Educational book publishing companies
Publishing companies of Germany
Book publishing companies of Germany
Publishing companies established in 1949